Sophronius  has been the name of several notable individuals:

 Saint Sophronius of Jerusalem (560–638), Patriarch of Jerusalem who negotiated the surrender of Jerusalem to the Muslim caliph Umar I in 637
 Patriarch Sophronius I of Constantinople, patriarch from 1463 to 1464
 Patriarch Sophronius II of Constantinople
 Patriarch Sophronius III of Constantinople, also known as Patriarch Sophronius IV of Alexandria
 Patriarch Sophronius I of Alexandria
 Patriarch Sophronius II of Alexandria
 Patriarch Sophronius III of Alexandria
 Saint Sophronius of Vratsa (1739–1813), a Bulgarian cleric and one of the leading figures of the early Bulgarian National Revival
 Sophronius S. Landt (1842–1926), American politician

See also 
 Sophronia (disambiguation)
 Sophronica
 Sofron
 Sofronie
 Sofronije